Boldklubberne Glostrup Albertslund (BGA) was a Danish football club currently playing in the Zealand Series. They play at Glostrup Idrætspark in Glostrup, Metropolitan Copenhagen, which has a capacity of 4,000.

It was a merger of Glostrup FK and Albertslund IF. The merger was dissolved in 2015.

External links
 Official site

Football clubs in Denmark
Association football clubs established in 2009
Glostrup Municipality
2009 establishments in Denmark